Club Deportivo Universidad de Concepción, also known as UdeC, is a Chilean basketball club based in the city of Concepción, Biobio Region. The sports club was officially founded August 8, 1994, but the professional basketball team begun in 1979, with the start of the Dimayor, the former Chilean professional League.

Their home games are played at the Casa del Deporte gym, located inside the Universidad de Concepción campus.

Trophies
 Liga Nacional: 2
2021, 2022
 Dimayor: 4
1995, 1997, 1998, 2012
 Copa Chile: 2
2014, 2022-23
Supercopa: 2
2021, 2022
 Dimayor Centro-Sur: 3
2007, 2008, 2014
 Dimayor Apertura: 1
2009

See also
University of Concepción
C.D. Universidad de Concepción (football team)

External links
Official Site

Universidad de Concepcion
Concepción, Chile
Basketball teams established in 1979
Sport in Biobío Region